The 2018–19 Atlantic Coast Conference women's basketball season began with practices in October 2018, followed by the start of the 2018–19 NCAA Division I women's basketball season in November. Conference play started in January 2019 and concluded in March with the 2019 ACC women's basketball tournament at the Greensboro Coliseum in Greensboro, NC.

Head coaches

Coaching changes
 Erik Johnson resigned as the head coach of Boston College and Joanna Bernabei-McNamee was named as his replacement.
Audra Smith would not be returning as coach of Clemson and Amanda Butler was named as her replacement.
Joanne Boyle retired from Virginia after the 2017–18 season and Tina Thompson was hired as her replacement.
Suzie McConnell-Serio would not be returning as coach of Pittsburgh and Lance White was hired as her replacement.

Coaches 

Notes:
 Year at school includes 2018–19 season.
 Overall and ACC records are from time at current school and are through the end the 2017–18 season.
 NCAA Tournament appearances are from time at current school only.
 NCAA Final Fours and Championship include time at other schools

Preseason

Preseason watch lists 
Below is a table of notable preseason watch lists.

ACC Women's Basketball Tip-off 
Prior to the start of the season, the ACC hosted a media day at the Sheraton/Le Méridien Hotel in Charlotte, North Carolina.  At the media day, the head coaches voted on the finishing order of the teams, an All-ACC team, a Preseason Player of the Year, and Newcomers to watch.  The media day was hosted on October 2, 2018.  A selected group of student athletes also took questions from the media on this day.  This question and answer period was live streamed on theacc.com.

At the media day, both the Head Coaches and the Blue Ribbon Panel selected Notre Dame to defend their title.

ACC preseason polls 

Preseason All-ACC Teams

Preseason ACC Player of the Year

Newcomer Watchlist

Regular season

Rankings

Note: The Coaches Poll releases a final poll after the NCAA tournament, but the AP Poll does not release a poll at this time.

Conference matrix
This table summarizes the head-to-head results between teams in conference play. Each team will play 16 conference games, and at least 1 against each opponent.

Player of the week
Throughout the conference regular season, the Atlantic Coast Conference offices named a Player(s) of the week and a Rookie(s) of the week.

Postseason

ACC tournament

NCAA tournament 

The ACC sent a record tying eight teams to the NCAA Tournament, including two number 1 seeds.  Eight teams were also selected in 2014, 2015, and 2018.  Eight teams was the most out of any conference this year.

National Invitation tournament

Honors and awards

ACC Awards

WNBA Draft

References